Steve White is an English musician and former member of the industrial band KMFDM, first joining the band in 2002 for the Sturm & Drang Tour, and later appearing on several live albums/DVDs and the studio albums Hau Ruck, Tohuvabohu and Blitz .  Previously he was a member of PIG, the project of fellow KMFDM contributor Raymond Watts. He worked on Sick (an album of Sow) together with other members of KMFDM. He is also known for his work remixing for other artists, such as Mindless Self Indulgence, Nude, and Pig. White resides in Seattle, Washington along with other members of the band.  White played guitars for SMP in 2007 on Chemlab's Detonation Days Tour. In 2008 White joined 16volt as their live guitarist for the Denial Highway North American tour. He released several albums with the band, including FullBlackHabit, American Porn Songs and Beating Dead Horses.

References

External links
Steve White's biography on KMFDM's website

1965 births
Living people
English rock guitarists
English male guitarists
KMFDM members